Jiyai Shin (Korean: 신지애 Shin Ji-ae, ; born 28 April 1988) is a former world No. 1 ranked South Korean professional golfer who primarily plays on the LPGA of Japan Tour as of the 2020 golf season.  She previously played primarily on the LPGA Tour and the LPGA of Korea Tour (KLPGA). She has broken existing KLPGA records, winning 10 events in 19 starts on the KLPGA Tour in 2007. In 2008, playing only 10 tournaments on the LPGA Tour as a non-member, she won three events, including the Women's British Open and the ADT Championship. She has been ranked No. 1 in the Women's World Golf Rankings for 25 weeks and was the first Asian to be ranked No. 1.

Amateur career
In 2005, while she was still in high school, Shin was the only amateur to win a KLPGA event that season when she won the SK Enclean Invitational. She turned professional at the end of the 2005 season.

Professional career

2006
Returning to the KLPGA as a rookie in 2006, she started her year with a pair of third-place finishes in her first two events and went on to claim three wins on the season.

2007
2007 marked Shin's breakout year. She played 19 events on the KLPGA and won 10 of them, shattering all existing Tour records. She also ventured onto the LPGA Tour for the first time and played three of the four women's major championships. At the U.S. Women's Open she finished sixth. The next month at the Evian Masters, an event on the LPGA Tour and a major on the Ladies European Tour, she finished tied for third. Shin finished 2007 ranked 8th in the world, the highest ranked Korean of all, and the only non-LPGA member who ranked in the top ten.

2008
Opening 2008 at the Women's World Cup of Golf, Shin and number two KLPGA player Eun-Hee Ji succumbed to the Philippines pair of Jennifer Rosales and Dorothy Delasin with a score of −16 after 3rd and final day of competition. Philippines scored −18 and received the $240,000 cheque.

Shin then played at the Women's Australian Open where she finished 2nd, losing to Karrie Webb in a playoff.

Shin won the Women's British Open in Berkshire, England for her first LPGA Tour and major win. This made her the first non-member of the LPGA to win a major since Laura Davies won the U.S. Women's Open in 1987. She won the 2008 Mizuno Classic in November, shooting scores of 68, 66 and 67. She was six shots ahead of the next competitor to win at −15 (201), to notch her second LPGA career win. Two weeks later she won the ADT Championship, the culminating event in the season-long LPGA playoff series, and claimed the $1 million prize. She became the first-ever non-LPGA member to win three LPGA tournaments.

2009
Shin's wins in LPGA Tour events in 2008 qualified her for LPGA membership in 2009. She got off to a slow start as an LPGA member, missing her first cut ever in an LPGA tournament at the season-opening SBS Open at Turtle Bay. She rebounded and won the third event of the season, the limited field HSBC Women's Champions, scoring 66 in both the third and fourth rounds. She won again in June at the full-field Wegmans LPGA tournament and in September at the P&G Beauty NW Arkansas Championship. By the first week of November she officially clinched the LPGA Rookie of the Year award.

She had been awarded a Talent Medal of Korea by the President of Korea in 2009.

2010
On 2 May, Shin won the Cyber Agent Ladies on the LPGA of Japan Tour. On 3 May, she became the World Number 1 ranked women's golfer, replacing Lorena Ochoa who finished in sixth place in an LPGA tournament the previous day. She held the position until it was taken over by Ai Miyazato on 21 June 2010 and regained it on 26 July after winning the Evian Masters.

On 19 September, Shin won the MetLife-Korea Economics KLPGA Championship, one of the major championships on the LPGA of Korea Tour. With this victory, Shin qualified for the KLPGA Hall of Fame, although she has to fulfill her career as professional golfer for 10 years before membership can be official. If she continues her professional career, she will be the third Hall of Famer in 2015, after Ok-Hee Ku and Se Ri Pak.

2014
Shin gave up her LPGA membership before the start of the season to be nearer to her family in Korea and played on the LPGA of Japan Tour, winning four times during the 2014 season.

2015
Shin won the Cyber Agent Ladies in early May for the second time in her career. She birdied three of the final five holes on the back nine to win by one stroke over Erika Kikuchi of Japan. This victory is her 10th win on the JLPGA Tour.

Honors and awards
2005

KLPGA Rookie of the Year
KLPGA Best Amateur

2006

KLPGA Money list leader

2007

KLPGA Player of the Year
KLPGA Money list leader

2008

KLPGA Player of the Year
KLPGA Money list leader

2009

LPGA Tour Rookie of the Year
LPGA Tour Money list leader
Golf Writers Association of America Female Player of the Year

2015
KLPGA Hall of Fame

2018
LPGA of Japan Tour Player of the Year

Personal life
In 2004 at age 16, Shin's mother was killed in a car accident. Her younger brother and sister were seriously injured and spent nearly a year in a hospital. Her mother's life insurance money funded the beginning of her golf career. Shin currently owns a home in Atlanta, Georgia, where she lives with her brother, stepmother, and father.

Endorsements
Shin has endorsement deals with Three Bond Holdings, Jatco, M.U Sports & Ecco.

Professional wins (63)

LPGA Tour wins (11)

LPGA Tour playoff record (2–0)

Co-sanctioned by the Ladies European Tour.
Co-sanctioned by the LPGA of Japan Tour.
Co-sanctioned by the ALPG Tour and the Ladies European Tour.

Ladies European Tour wins (6)

Co-sanctioned by the LPGA Tour.
Co-sanctioned by the ALPG Tour and the LPGA Tour.
Co-sanctioned by the ALPG Tour.
Tournaments in bold denotes major tournaments in LET.

LPGA of Japan Tour wins (29)

Co-sanctioned by the LPGA Tour.
Tournaments in bold denotes major tournaments in JLPGA.

LPGA of Korea Tour wins (21)

Tournaments in bold denotes major tournaments in KLPGA

Ladies Asian Golf Tour wins (1)

WPGA Tour of Australasia wins (4)

Co-sanctioned by the LPGA Tour and the Ladies European Tour.
Co-sanctioned by the Ladies European Tour.

Major championships

Wins (2)

Results timeline
Results not in chronological order before 2019.

^ The Evian Championship was added as a major in 2013.

CUT = missed the half-way cut
"T" tied

Summary

Most consecutive cuts made – 22 (2007 Kraft Nabisco – 2013 LPGA)
Longest streak of top-10s – 4 (2009 British Open – 2010 U.S. Open)

LPGA Tour career summary

1 Shin's $24,349 earnings at the 2009 Honda LPGA Thailand were considered unofficial under LPGA rules and are not included in this total.
* Includes matchplay and other events without a cut.
official through 23 November 2014

World ranking
Position in Women's World Golf Rankings at the end of each calendar year.

Team appearances
Professional
Lexus Cup (representing Asia team): 2007 (winners)
World Cup (representing South Korea): 2007, 2008
The Queens (representing Korea): 2016 (captain, winners)

See also
List of golfers with most LPGA Tour wins

References

External links

Biography on seoulsisters.com
Ji-Yai Shin pictures

South Korean female golfers
LPGA of Japan Tour golfers
LPGA Tour golfers
LPGA of Korea Tour golfers
Winners of LPGA major golf championships
Yonsei University alumni
Sportspeople from South Jeolla Province
1988 births
Living people